Gordon Lavergne  (April 6, 1911 – March 21, 1970) was an Ontario political figure. He represented Russell in the Legislative Assembly of Ontario as a Progressive Conservative from 1954 to 1963.

Background
He was born in Eastview, the son of Henry Lavergne. In 1935, he married Yvonne Goulet and they had four children. Lavergne was a merchant.

Politics
He served as mayor of Eastview (the name of Vanier, Ontario prior to 1969) from 1948 to 1960.

He was elected to the Ontario assembly in a 1954 by-election held after the death of Joseph Daniel Nault. He was defeated for the PC nomination for the 1963 general election by Bert Lawrence, and Lavergne retired from politics after failing to get elected as an Independent Progressive Conservative. He died of an apparent heart attack in 1970.

References 
 Histoire des Comtes Unis de Prescott et de Russell, L. Brault (1963)
 Normandin, Pierre G., ed. The Canadian Parliamentary Guide. Ottawa, Normandin(1963)
 Paquette, Léo. Vanier (Eastview) au temps des maires G.H.A. Collins 1928-1929-1930, David Langelier 1931–32. Ville de Vanier, 2001.
 Quesnel, Albert. Nécrologies des pierres tombales du cimetière Notre-Dame d’Ottawa. Vanier, Les Éditions Quesnel de Fomblanche,1981-, Volume 7.
 Sylvestre, Paul-François. Nos parlementaires. Ottawa, Les Éditions l’Interligne, second Edition, 1987.
 The Ottawa Citizen, 5 December 1950, page 19.

Notes

External links 
 

1911 births
1970 deaths
Franco-Ontarian people
Mayors of Eastview and Vanier
Progressive Conservative Party of Ontario MPPs